Ribostamycin:4-(gamma-L-glutamylamino)-(S)-2-hydroxybutanoyl-(BtrI acyl-carrier protein) 4-(gamma-L-glutamylamino)-(S)-2-hydroxybutanoate transferase (btrH (gene)) is an enzyme with systematic name ribostamycin:4-(gamma-L-glutamylamino)-(S)-2-hydroxybutanoyl-(BtrI acyl-carrier protein) 4-(gamma-L-glutamylamino)-(S)-2-hydroxybutanoate transferase. This enzyme catalyses the following chemical reaction

 4-(gamma-L-glutamylamino)-(S)-2-hydroxybutanoyl-[BtrI acyl-carrier protein] + ribostamycin  gamma-L-glutamyl-butirosin B + BtrI acyl-carrier protein

The enzyme attaches the side chain of the aminoglycoside antibiotics of the butirosin family.

References

External links 
 

EC 2.3.2